Raunds  is a  market town in North Northamptonshire, England. It had a population of 9,379 at the 2021 census.

Geography 
The town is on the southern edge of the Nene Valley and surrounded by arable farming land.

Nearest civilian airports are Luton 50 miles and East Midlands 65 miles.

Raunds is close to Stanwick Lakes, a country park developed from gravel pits and managed by the Rockingham Forest Trust. This park is internationally recognised for its birdlife and can be reached on foot from Raunds along Meadow Lane bridleway.

History 
In the mid-1980s, during sand excavations in the Nene Valley, the remains of a Roman villa were discovered. Excavation of the area, near Stanwick, was delayed by several years while archaeologists studied the remains. In 2002 Channel 4's Time Team excavated a garden and found remains of an Anglo-Saxon cemetery.

The place-name Raunds is first attested in an Anglo-Saxon charter of c. 972–992, where it appears as Randan. It appears as Rande in Domesday Book (1086); and as Raundes in a later survey of Northamptonshire. The name is the plural of the Old English rand, meaning "border".

Raunds played a role in the boot and shoe industry until its decline in the 1950s and 1960s. In 1905 a dispute arose about wages to be paid to army bootmakers, which culminated in a march to London in May that year. Several factories remained into the early 1990s but all are now closed, with many being demolished and housing estates built. The Coggins boot factory  was the last to go, and the site of it is now Coggins Close. The land on which the shoe factory and the original Coggins houses stood (not Coggins Close), was purchased by Robert Coggins on 25 February 1899 from the Duchy of Lancaster, for the sum of £14.10s.0d (£14.50). The houses are still there, but were sold to Charles Robinson of Wellingborough in 1934. Robert Coggins lived in the hall where his picture hangs in the meeting room, and he is buried in St Peter's Churchyard. There is no industry in the town now, although there are some industrial sites on the outskirts.

Notable buildings 

The Historic England website contains details of a total of 19 listed buildings and six scheduled monuments at or in the vicinity of Raunds. Amongst them are:
 St Peter's Church, Church Street.
 The Manor House, 2 Manor Street.

St Peter's, CoE is in the Diocese of Peterborough and St Thomas More's, RC is in the Diocese of Northampton.

Demography 
 In 1801 there were 800 persons
 In 1831 there were 1,370 persons
 In 1841 there were 1,653 persons
 In 2011 there were 8,641 persons
 In 2021 there were 9,379 persons

Transport

Road
Raunds is adjacent to the A45 and close to the A14 jct 13. Access to the M1 and A1 is close and the A14 runs from Britain's largest container port at Felixstowe in Suffolk to join the M6. Consequently, the area attracts distribution companies warehouses.

Bus
Bus services are limited, the X46 links the town with Wellingborough, Rushden and Northampton, running half-hourly. There are intermittent routes to Huntingdon and a local service termed the 'Raunds Rover'.

Rail
Connections are provided by East Midlands Railway from Wellingborough and Kettering railway stations, for direct trains to London St Pancras International, Nottingham, Sheffield and Leeds.

There was once a Raunds railway station, on the Midland Railway's cross-country line from Kettering to Huntingdon, closed in September 1959, and which gave access to St Ives and Cambridge, though Raunds station was sited 1½ miles from the town. It was also planned that the Midland's Wellingborough to Higham Ferrers branch, also closed in 1959, would continue to Raunds, but landowners prevented it.

The Manchester, Sheffield & Lincolnshire Railway (the forerunner of the Great Central), proposed a line from Doncaster to Raunds in an early version of its bid to build a trunk line to the capital. This line never came to fruition, and the company eventually built its London Extension via Nottingham, Leicester, Rugby and Brackley.

Waterways
Stanwick Lakes are within walking or cycling distance of Raunds, and river ways connect to the Nene Valley river section. By boat, Oundle can be reached in a day. The Nene Valley river section connects to the Middle Level Navigation System, making it possible to reach Cambridge and Peterborough. The nearest marina is Willy Watt's in Ringstead, Northamptonshire.

Trade 
There are many small businesses and many people commute to larger centres for work. Raunds is home to a Hotpoint distribution centre, and depots for Robert Wiseman Dairies, Avery Dennison, DPD, Howdens Joinery and Dr. Martens, all located on the Warth Park estate. Raunds Co-operative Society ran a supermarket and department store and had 4,000 members until 2007 when it merged with the larger Midlands Co-operative Society. There is also an Asda store in the town, which opened on 24 April 2017. The shops still operate.

A market is held on Fridays in the square. Regular stalls include butchers, plant stockists, home-made jewellery and confectioners. Local organisations and clubs can also set up a stall.

Education
Raunds has:
a day nursery
a playgroup
an infant school
a primary school
a junior school
a secondary school,

Culture 
Raunds holds an annual music festival over a weekend in early May. Events include: rock, jazz and folk concerts starring nationally and internationally known artists, performances by Raunds Community Choir and Raunds Temperance Band, song and tune sessions, dancing displays, a ceilidh and an annual youth dance competition.

Raunds Music and Drama Society (MADS) holds several stage performances throughout the year.

The town holds a Christmas festival in the square. Continental markets are held annually to celebrate neighbouring countries.

Woodbine Working Men's Club (1901-2005) and the Conservative Club (1920 to date) have offered community and recreational facilities.

For the past few years, an annual beer festival has been held at the cricket club. This features a range of local beers and ciders, as well as traditional world beverages, accompanied by local music artists.

Sport and leisure

Football

Raunds Town F.C. are at Kiln Park and play in the United Counties League. As well as the first team, they also have reserve, women's and youth teams.
Raunds Tigers F.C. focus on junior football and have several youth teams.

Cricket

Raunds Town Cricket Club have a ground in Marshalls Road. The team plays in the Northamptonshire Cricket League.

Archery

Archers of Raunds meet at Manor School and Sports College.

Mayors of Raunds 

In 2005, Raunds Town Council decided to elect a Mayor rather than having a chairman of the council.

Holders of the post have been:
2005-06: Lisa Costello
2006-07: Dudley Hughes
2007-08: Michelle Goring
2008-10: Peter Wathen
2010-13: Michael Clements
2013-14: Pauline Williams
2014-15: Louisa Thomas
2015-17: Helen Howell
2017-18: Nicholas Beck
2018-20: Richard Levell
2020-22: Sylvia Hughes
2022-  : Richard Levell

Town councillors

Saxon Ward
Bill Cross
Ollie Curtis
Helen Howell
Dudley Hughes
Magdalena Levell
Lee Wilkes

Windmill Ward 
Rosalie Beattie
Paul Byrne
Kirk Harrison
Richard Levell (Mayor)
Trevor Swailes
 Vacancy

Notable former and current residents

Ada Salter (1866–1942), an environmentalist
Sir David Frost, a television personality

Nearby settlements
Ringstead, Keyston, Stanwick, Rushden, Higham Ferrers, Thrapston, Hargrave, Wellingborough, Irthlingborough, Chelveston

References

Further reading 
Hall, David; Raunds: Picturing the past (F.W. March, 1988)

External links
16. Raunds Town Council
Raunds War Memorials Research

 
Towns in Northamptonshire
Market towns in Northamptonshire
Civil parishes in Northamptonshire
North Northamptonshire